Deh-e Nik Mohammad (also Romanized as Deh-e Nīk Moḩammad; also known as Nīk Moḩammad) is a village in Dust Mohammad Rural District, in the Central District of Hirmand County, Sistan and Baluchestan Province, Iran. At the 2006 census, its population was 162, in 30 families.

References 

Populated places in Hirmand County